Kohlhiesel's Daughters (German: Kohlhiesels Töchter) is a 1943 German comedy film directed by Kurt Hoffmann and starring Eduard Köck, Heli Finkenzeller and Oskar Sima. It is one of a number of film adaptations of Hanns Kräly's play of the same name.

The film's sets were designed by the art directors Franz Koehn and Willy Schiller. Location shooting took place at Lake Ossiach in Carinthia.

Cast
 Eduard Köck as Mathias Kohlhöfer, genannt Kohlhiesel 
 Heli Finkenzeller as Veronika Kohlhöfer 
 Oskar Sima as Simon Moser, genannt Jodok-Simerl 
 Erika von Thellmann as Mosers Wirtschafterin Theres 
 Margarete Haagen as Kohlhiesels Wirtschafterin Sophie 
 Leo Peukert as Gemeindevorsteher 
 Sepp Rist as Kaspar Pointer 
 Josef Eichheim as Thomas Altlechner 
 Paul Richter as Bertl 
 Klaus Pohl as Gemeindediener Paulus 
 Fritz Kampers as Schmied Unterhuber 
 Marta Salm as Franzi Unterhuber 
 Beppo Brem as Florian

References

Bibliography 
 Ludewig, Alexandra. Screening Nostalgia: 100 Years of German Heimat Film. transcript Verlag, 2014.

External links 
 

1943 films
1943 comedy films
German comedy films
Films of Nazi Germany
1940s German-language films
Films directed by Kurt Hoffmann
German black-and-white films
Films set in the Alps
Remakes of German films
Tobis Film films
1940s German films